The Urban Training Project (UTP) was an initiative to encourage black workers in South Africa to form new trade unions.

During the 1960s, the Trade Union Council of South Africa (TUCSA) had first permitted unions representing black workers to affiliate, then banned them, in response to a backlash from many of its white affiliates.  Its African affairs section closed in 1969.  Former officials of the section established the Urban Training Project in Johannesburg the following year, with the intention of educating black workers on trade unionism and works councils.

Numerous trade unions were created through the work of the project:

In 1973, the affiliates founded the Black Consultative Committee (BCC), as a loose federation.  This began working closely with TUCSA, and led rival unions to accuse the BCC unions of not being truly independent.

In 1979, some of the committee's affiliates joined the new Federation of South African Trade Unions, leading to their expulsion from the group.  Most of the remaining unions took part in the formation of the Council of Unions of South Africa on 14 September 1980.

References

National trade union centres of South Africa
Trade unions established in 1973
Trade unions disestablished in 1980